Bangladesh Mashoor-ul-Haque Memorial High School and College, commonly known as Bangladesh M. H. M. School, is a non-government institution operated by the Bangladesh Embassy in Qatar. It was established in 1979.

The institution follows the national curriculum of Bangladesh under the Board of Intermediate and Secondary Education (BISE) of Dhaka.

History

It was established in 1979.

In 2005, the chairperson of the BISE of Dhaka, Prof. Shaheda Obaed, stated that the managing committee setup is not legal under BISE rules and should be abolished.  The BISE also stated that no teachers may be fired without BISE approval; there was controversy after the principal of MHM fired two popular teachers.

The school was renovated in 2006.

Transport
This school does not uses its own transport for the comfort of its students and facilities.  school  maintains a fleet of school buses.  the school had over 35 buses,  Three of which were recently acquired.

Student body
 the school had around 3000 to 4000 students. It serves the Bangladeshi expatriates in Qatar .

References

External links

 Bangladesh M.H.M. School & College

International schools in Qatar
Bangladesh–Qatar relations
1979 establishments in Qatar
Educational institutions established in 1979
Bangladeshi international schools